WAYS (1500 AM) was a radio station serving the Macon, Georgia area with a sports radio format. This station was under ownership of Cumulus Media.

History
Until September 4, 2009, it was an affiliate of ABC Radio's True Oldies Channel when it was Oldies Radio 1500, with the slogan "Macon's True Oldies Channel".

Because it shared the same frequency as clear-channel station WFED in Washington, D.C., it could broadcast only during daytime hours. However, their online webcast is available 24 hours a day.

On February 25, 2020, WAYS (which had adopted the WRWM call letters on February 20; WAYS was transferred to 1050 AM in Conway, South Carolina) went off the air and surrendered its license to the FCC. The FCC cancelled the station's license on February 27, 2020.

Previous logo

References

External links
FCC Station Search Details: DWRWM (Facility ID: 68678)
FCC History Cards for WRWM  (covering 1966-1981 as WDEN)

RWM
Radio stations established in 1967
Cumulus Media radio stations
RWM
1967 establishments in Georgia (U.S. state)
Defunct radio stations in the United States
Radio stations disestablished in 2020
2020 disestablishments in Georgia (U.S. state)
RWM